Mount Falla is a prominent conical mountain,  high, standing  northeast of Mount Stonehouse, between Berwick Glacier and Prebble Glacier, in the Queen Alexandra Range, Antarctica. It was sighted in January 1958 by the New Zealand party of the Commonwealth Trans-Antarctic Expedition (1956–58), and named for R.A. Falla, a member of the Ross Sea Committee.

References 

Mountains of the Ross Dependency
Shackleton Coast